New Jersey's 12th Legislative District is one of 40 in the state, covering the Burlington County municipalities of Chesterfield Township, New Hanover Township, North Hanover Township and Wrightstown Borough; the Middlesex County municipality of Old Bridge Township; the Monmouth County municipalities of Allentown Borough, Englishtown Borough, Manalapan Township, Matawan Borough, Millstone Township, Roosevelt Borough and Upper Freehold Township; and the Ocean County municipalities of Jackson Township and Plumsted Township as of the 2011 apportionment.

Demographic characteristics
As of the 2020 United States census, the district had a population of 230,971, of whom 182,139 (78.9%) were of voting age. The racial makeup of the district was 167,675 (72.6%) White, 15,755 (6.8%) African American, 625 (0.3%) Native American, 19,231 (8.3%) Asian, 105 (0.0%) Pacific Islander, 9,349 (4.0%) from some other race, and 18,231 (7.9%) from two or more races. Hispanic or Latino of any race were 27,497 (11.9%) of the population.

The district had 167,202 registered voters as of December 1, 2021, of whom 67,442 (40.3%) were registered as unaffiliated, 51,274 (30.7%) were registered as Republicans, 46,354 (27.7%) were registered as Democrats, and 2,132 (1.3%) were registered to other parties.

Political representation
For the 2022–2023 session, the district is represented in the State Senate by Samuel D. Thompson (D, Old Bridge Township) and in the General Assembly by Robert D. Clifton (R, Matawan) and Alex Sauickie (R, Jackson Township). Sauickie was appointed to the vacant seat previously held by Ronald S. Dancer (R, Plumsted Township), who had served the district from the start of the session until his death on July 23, 2022. Thompson served as a Republican until switching his party affiliation to Democratic on February 13, 2023.

The legislative district overlaps with New Jersey's 3rd, 4th, 6th and 12th congressional districts.

1965–1973
In the interim period between the 1964 Supreme Court decision Reynolds v. Sims which required the creation of state legislature districts to be made as equal in population as possible and the 1973 creation of the 40-district map, the 12th District consisted of all of Hudson County. Senators were elected at-large in the 12th District; three members of the Senate were elected in the 1965 and 1971 elections for a two-year term and four Senators were elected for the four-year term elected in the 1967 elections. From 1967 until 1971, the 12th Senate District was split into four Assembly districts with each district electing two members. For the final election held under the interim measures, the 12th Senate District was split into three Assembly districts each electing two members and an additional Assembly member elected at-large by the entire county.

The members elected to the Senate from this district are as follows:

The members elected to the Assembly from each district are as follows:

District composition since 1973
When the 40-district legislative map was created in 1973, the 12th District first included the Middlesex County townships of Monroe Township and Madison (now Old Bridge) and the northern Monmouth County municipalities of Matawan borough and township (the latter now Aberdeen), Keyport, Union Beach, Keansburg, Middletown Township, and Red Bank. For the 1981 redistricting, almost the entire district was changed, only retaining Red Bank from the previous map. It consisted of all of western Monmouth County and some boroughs of northeastern Monmouth including Tinton Falls, Rumson, and West Long Branch. In the 1991 redistricting, the total area of the district was reduced as the four panhandle municipalities of western Monmouth and some of the boroughs on the east side of the district were shifted to other districts. The district became a long, narrow district in an east–west fashion in the 2001 redistricting stretching from Oceanport through the central Monmouth townships, and continuing into East Windsor and Hightstown in Mercer County. Following the 2011 redistricting, the district boundaries experienced yet another major change when it became composed of municipalities from four counties, Burlington, Ocean, Monmouth, and Middlesex.

Election history

Election results, 1973–present

Senate

General Assembly

Election results, 1965–1973

Senate

General Assembly

District 12A

District 12B

District 12C

District 12D

District 12 At-large

References

Burlington County, New Jersey
Middlesex County, New Jersey
Monmouth County, New Jersey
Ocean County, New Jersey
12